Rock N Raï is a compilation album of songs by raï singer Rachid Taha and was first released in 2008 by Shock Records under licence from Barclay Records.

"Rock N Raï" contains a different selection of tracks to that included in The Definitive Collection, which was released by Wrasse in 2007.

It was followed by a second compilation "Rock N Raï 2" (2010).

Video clips have been made for "Barbés" (1991), "Ya Rayah" (1997), "Écoute Moi Camarade" (2006) & "Voilà, Voilà" (2012).

"Rock N Raï" (2008) track listing
"Ala Jalkoum" featuring Femi Kuti
"Barbés"
"Barra Barra"
"Desolé"
"Dinaha"
"Écoute Moi Camarade"
"Foqt Foqt"
"Kelma"
"Malheureux Toujours"
"Malika"
 "Medina" (Album Version)
"Non Non Non" (Multinational Version) 
"Olé, Olé"
" Rock El Casbah"
"Valencia" featuring Kirsty Hawkshaw
"Voilà, Voilà"
"Malika"
"Ya Rayah"

"Rock N Raï 2" (2010) track listing
"Barra Barra"
"Bonjour" featuring Gaëtan Roussel
"Voilà, Voilà"
"Qalantiqa"
"Meftuh'"
"Ya Rayah"
"Ala Jalkoum" featuring Femi Kuti
"Kelma"
"Nokta"
"Jungle Fiction"
"Lli Fat Mat!"
"This Is An Arabian Song" featuring Bruno Maman
"Ach Adani"
"Rock El Casbah"
"Aiya Aiya"
"Boire"
"En Retard"
"Écoute Moi Camarade"

References

External links
Official website

Rachid Taha albums
2008 compilation albums
2010 compilation albums